Isabella Holland (born 2 January 1992) is an Australian former professional tennis player.

Career
Holland's preferred surfaces are clay and hardcourt.

Her highest WTA singles ranking of world No. 179 she reached on 5 December 2011. Her highest WTA doubles ranking is 277, which she achieved on 27 February 2012.

In 2008, Holland reached the final of the girls' doubles at Wimbledon partnering Sally Peers, losing to Polona Hercog and Jessica Moore 3–6, 6–1, 2–6.

ITF Circuit finals

Singles: 6 (2 titles, 4 runner–ups)

Doubles: 8 (3–5)

References

External links
 
 
 

1992 births
Living people
Australian female tennis players
Tennis players from Brisbane